The name Beit Warszawa refers to 3 independent institutions operating in Poland:

Foundation Beit Warszawa - Reform Jewish Community in Poland, an independent charity whose chairman is Severyn Ashkenazy. It has operated in Poland since 2009.
Beit Warszawa Jewish Culture Association - an association operating since 2002, whose chairman is Michael Levi.
Beit Warszawa branch of Beit Polska - Union of Progressive Jewish Communities (also known as Beit Warszawa)  – a reform community operating in Warsaw as a branch of the Beit Polska Religious Association, whose details are not public, according to the Polish Law of Religious Associations.

References

Charities based in Poland
Judaism in Poland